Grand Prix World is the official racing management simulation game of the 1998 Formula One World Championship developed and published by MicroProse. It is the sequel to Grand Prix Manager 2. It is officially licensed by Formula One Group, and holds an official license of Formula One's 1998 season. The game was released for Microsoft Windows in 1999. Due to its in-depth realistic gameplay and representation of a Formula One team management, it is often referred as the best racing management simulation game ever released.

Gameplay
The player takes control of one of the 11 F1 teams participating in the 1998 Formula One season. Team names or details could not be changed within the game itself. This was only able to be done using a 3rd party editor.

Grand Prix World is very different from the preceding games, even though they largely share the same code base, the major changes coming in the interface design and negotiation modules with sponsors, drivers, engineers. This results in fewer 'freak' results such as player being able to sign top-line drivers for the bottom-ranking teams, or being able to score points with said teams without major reorganisation of the team.

Windows 2000, XP, Vista Compatibility Issues 
The game was not compatible with Windows 2000, the use of "Windows 98 Compatibility Mode" being required to make the game work in these later operating systems, ALT and TAB functionality is also not available, resulting in a crash of the game.

Game Community and Updates
One official patch was released by the games designers and is available from their website. This game still has an active community built around it with season updates being produced.

References

 - GPW section on Edward Grabowski website

1999 video games
Video games developed in the United Kingdom
Windows games
Windows-only games
Sports management video games
Formula One video games